Rushop or Rushup is a small North Derbyshire village. It is in the town of Chapel-en-le-Frith.
Agriculture has until recently been the main occupation in the village. At present very few of the residents work in Rushop and several of the houses are second homes only occupied at weekends and holidays.

There is archaeological and documentary evidence that there was a settlement at this site since before the Roman invasion of Britain. The settlement is alleged to have been a British village, under nominal Anglo Saxon rule after the fall of the area to Angles from Bernicia around 590, mainly due to the lack of Anglo Saxon placenames in the valley and the presence of names, such as Eccles, Inch and Pen-, which have origins in a Brythonic language of Britain.

References

Villages in Derbyshire
Towns and villages of the Peak District
Chapel-en-le-Frith